Séamus Whelan (born 1938 in Piercetown, County Wexford) is an Irish former sportsperson. He played hurling with his local club St Martin's and was a member of the Wexford senior inter-county team from 1966 until 1968.

References

1938 births
Living people
St Martin's (Wexford) hurlers
Wexford inter-county hurlers
All-Ireland Senior Hurling Championship winners